Heretic Pride is the eleventh studio album by the Mountain Goats, released in the UK on February 18, 2008, and in the US on February 19 by 4AD, their sixth album on the label. It is the first to feature the band's lineup of John Darnielle, Peter Hughes, and Jon Wurster. The album was produced by Scott Solter and John Vanderslice.

Notes
According to Pitchfork, the album takes its title from Aura Noir's song "Black Deluge Night" (found on their 2004 album The Merciless) which contains the couplet "Soaring demons now swarm the skies/ In awe and heretic pride".

A three-page comic book press kit was created for this album, with John Darnielle giving a brief text description of each song and songwriter/artist Jeffrey Lewis providing the illustrations.  This art is not included in the album packaging, and was created only for promotional usage prior to album release.

Reception

Heretic Pride received mostly positive reviews, with website Metacritic projecting an aggregate score of 74/100. The Guardian critic Maddy Costa praised the album as "13 absorbing songs, sparingly orchestrated to concentrate attention on the lyrics [...] that grows more enveloping with every listen.". Pitchfork critic Zach Baron awarded the album a rating of 8.0/10, and notes that it marks a return to earlier Mountain Goats albums, both musically and lyrically, and praises the album for its balance, stating "For every furious declaration, there's a moment of uncertainty."

On the negative side, Mojo awarded the album only 2/5, arguing that "[t]he polished arrangements of Heretic Pride do Darnielle's songwriting no favours". Similarly, despite acknowledging that John Darnielle "is a monstrously talented guy," Slant Magazine criticises the album for going over old territory, arguing that Darnielle "has covered every last of these inches before," and that "[t]he lack of the sort of overarching theme that powered previous discography standouts Tallahassee and The Sunset Tree through their dull bits means that these moments rob the record of a lot of momentum and goodwill."

Track listing

Personnel
John Darnielle – vocals, guitar
Franklin Bruno – piano, organ
Annie Clark – guitar, backing vocals
Erik Friedlander – arrangement, strings
Peter Hughes – electric guitar, bass guitar
Jon Wurster – drums, percussion
Rachel Ware Zooi – backing vocals
Sarah Arslanian – backing vocals
John Vanderslice – synthesizer, production
Scott Solter – additional percussion, production, recording, mixing
Aaron Prellwitz – recording
Timin Murray – assistant recording

References 

The Mountain Goats albums
2008 albums
4AD albums
Albums produced by Scott Solter